

275001–275100 

|-bgcolor=#f2f2f2
| colspan=4 align=center | 
|}

275101–275200 

|-id=106
| 275106 Sarahdubeyjames ||  || Sarah Jane Dubey-James (born 1977), the second daughter of British discoverer Norman Falla || 
|}

275201–275300 

|-id=215
| 275215 Didiermarouani ||  || Didier Marouani (born 1953) is a world famous French composer and musician. He is the leader of the band Space, a pioneer of electronic space music. His music is loved by several generations of fans of astronomy and cosmonautics, who feel it inspires them to reach out to the stars. || 
|-id=264
| 275264 Krisztike ||  || Kristina Kürtiova (born 1995), a daughter of Slovak amateur astronomer Stefan Kürti who discovered this minor planet || 
|-id=281
| 275281 Amywalsh ||  || Amy L. Walsh (born 1970), an avionics engineer at Ball Aerospace who developed and helps operate the WISE/NEOWISE command and data handling system (Src). || 
|}

275301–275400 

|-bgcolor=#f2f2f2
| colspan=4 align=center | 
|}

275401–275500 

|-bgcolor=#f2f2f2
| colspan=4 align=center | 
|}

275501–275600 

|-bgcolor=#f2f2f2
| colspan=4 align=center | 
|}

275601–275700 

|-bgcolor=#f2f2f2
| colspan=4 align=center | 
|}

275701–275800 

|-id=786
| 275786 Bouley ||  || Sylvain Bouley (born 1982), a French planetary geologist who studies impact cratering (Src) || 
|}

275801–275900 

|-bgcolor=#f2f2f2
| colspan=4 align=center | 
|}

275901–276000 

|-id=962
| 275962 Chalverat ||  || Joseph Chalverat (born 1950), the second curator of the Jura natural science museum in Porrentruy from 1999 to 2008. || 
|}

References 

275001-276000